The Advanced Inertial Reference Sphere (AIRS) is a highly accurate inertial guidance system designed for use in the LGM-118A Peacekeeper ICBM which was intended for precision nuclear strikes against Soviet missile silos.

Details
AIRS is a Fluid-suspended gyrostabilized platform system, as opposed to one using a Gimballed gyrostabilized platform.  It consists of a beryllium sphere floating in fluid. Jet nozzles are used to stabilize the inertial platform as commanded from the sensors. This design not only eliminates the problem of gimbal lock, but also makes it extremely accurate (drift less than 1.5×10−5 °/h), accurate enough so any further improvement would give a negligible benefit to the missile's CEP. 

The sensors used in AIRS are floated gas bearing gyroscopes and SFIR accelerometers which are derivatives of PIGA accelerometers. Although this type of accelerometer is most accurate it contains many precise parts which makes them very expensive to build (approximately $6,000,000 per AIRS unit, year 1987 dollar, development cost is not included). PIGA/SFIR accelerometers are also very susceptible to failure because of complicated design.

Usage
The AIRS was originally developed for the LGM-118A Peacekeeper.  The first AIRS units were manufactured by Northrop.

External links
Detailed description
J. LUKESH. "Characterization testing of the MX AIRS 149 Advanced Inertial Reference Sphere", Guidance and Control Conference, Guidance, Navigation, and Control and Co-located Conferences, doi:10.2514/6.1979-1888

Military technology
Missile guidance
Navigational equipment